Louise Gunvor Catharina Lagercrantz Boije af Gennäs (born Boije af Gennäs 1 November 1961) is a Swedish writer, feminist, and co-creator of Rederiet, the longest-running Swedish soap opera in history.

Boije af Gennäs best-selling novel, the semi-autobiographical Stjärnor utan svindel (Stars Without Vertigo) from 1996, is based on the author's relationship with the prominent feminist Mian Lodalen. The story unleashes the tale of 32-year-old Sophie, who enjoys conjugal contentment with a businessman while building a career as a novelist and journalist. The couple's bourgeois life amid Stockholm's jet set lurches toward the wild side, however, when the lesbian radical feminist Kaja enters the scene, the friendship between the two women erupts into a passionate love affair.

Bibliography 
 Ta vad man vill ha (1991)
 Ju mer jag ser dig (1992)
 Ingen människa en ö (1994)
 Stjärnor utan svindel (1996)
 Rent hus (1999)
 När kärleken kom (1999)

Filmography 
 Rederiet (1992)
 Snoken (1993)
 Skilda världar (1996)

Notes

External links 

Swedish feminists
Swedish nobility
1961 births
Living people
Swedish women writers